I've Been Doin' Some Thinkin' is an album by American pianist, vocalist and composer Mose Allison recorded for the Atlantic label in 1968.

Reception

Allmusic awarded the album 4 stars with its review by Eugene Chadbourne stating, "Three years had gone by between this release and the previous Mose Allison outing on Atlantic, perhaps giving the artist time to concoct some of the really tasty lyrics he came up with".<ref name="Allmusic">{{AllMusic|first=Eugene |last=Chadbourne |class=album |id=mw0000225317 |title=I've Been Doin' Some Thinkin''' – Review |accessdate=September 25, 2015}}</ref> The Penguin Guide to Jazz wrote that the album "is Allison's darkest and most world-aware record".

Track listingAll compositions by Mose Allison except as indicated''
 "Just Like Livin'" – 1:44
 "City Home" – 3:37
 "If You're Goin' to the City" – 2:48
 "Now You See It" – 2:27
 "You Are My Sunshine" (Jimmie Davis, Charles Mitchell) – 2:07
 "Your Molecular Structure" – 2:05
 "Look What You Made Me Do" – 2:31
 "If You Really Loved Me" – 2:13
 "Everybody Cryin' Mercy" – 2:39
 "Feel So Good" – 2:49
 "Let It Come Down" – 1:56
 "Back on the Corner" – 2:05

Personnel 
Mose Allison – piano, vocals
Red Mitchell – bass 
Bill Goodwin – drums

References 

1968 albums
Mose Allison albums
Atlantic Records albums